Air Balloon was launched in 1784 at Yarmouth as a coaster. She was captured in 1797. She then disappeared from United Kingdom records until 1824. She was almost rebuilt in 1825, only to suffer a major maritime incident in 1826. She was refloated and resumed sailing, but was wrecked in 1829.

Career
Air Balloon first appeared in Lloyd's Register (LR) in 1784.

On 27 March 1798, Air Balloon was sailing from Blakeney, Norfolk to Salcombe when a French vessel captured her and took her into Boulogne.

Air Balloon returned to Lloyd's Register in 1824. She re-entered the Register of Shipping (RS) in 1825, with information that disagreed with that in Lloyd's Register.

On 7 September 1826, Air Balloon, James Brown, master was driven ashore at Whitby; her crew were rescued. She was on a voyage from Littlehampton, to her homeport of Sunderland, County Durham. Air Balloon was refloated on 17 September and taken in to Whitby.

Fate
On 13 August 1829 Air Balloon sprang a leak and foundered in the North Sea off Scarborough. She was on a voyage from Sunderland to Chatham, Kent. She was sold as a wreck, refloated on 21 August and taken into Scarborough.

She was last listed in the 1829 volume of Lloyd's Register. She was last listed in the Register of Shipping in 1833, but with data stale since 1828.

Notes, citations, and references
Notes

Citations

References
 

1784 ships
Age of Sail merchant ships of England
Captured ships
Maritime incidents in September 1826
Maritime incidents in August 1829